"Digging in the Dirt" is a song by British musician Peter Gabriel. It was released as the first single taken from his sixth studio album, Us, on 7 September 1992. The song was a minor hit on the US Billboard Hot 100, peaking at number 52, but it topped both the Billboard Modern Rock Tracks and Album Rock Tracks charts. The song was moderately successful on the UK Singles Chart, where it peaked at number 24, and it reached the top 10 in Canada, Portugal, and Sweden.

Music video

The music video for the single was directed by John Downer and utilised stop motion animation, a technique used in the videos for Gabriel's earlier hits "Sledgehammer" and "Big Time". The work was painstaking, especially for Gabriel himself who was required to lie still for hours at a time over the course of several days. The video won the Grammy Award for Best Short Form Music Video in 1993. The woman in the video is played by Francesca Gonshaw.

According to Gabriel himself, "the meadow of flowers from the final scenes of the "Digging in the Dirt" video were actually filmed at the edge of the carpark at Real World Studios."

The video is largely an exploration of the issues in his personal life at the time, the end of his relationship with Rosanna Arquette, his desire to reconnect with his daughter and the self-healing he was looking for in therapy.

In the video, Gabriel is displayed in a variety of disturbing imagery, including being buried alive, consumed by an overgrowth of foliage (thanks to a gruelling stop-motion process) and flying into a rage while trying to swat a wasp (after being stung). This time, Gabriel returned to stop motion and claymation that had served him so well in the 1980s, forgoing the computer graphics used in "Steam".

Initially, the word "DIG" forms in the grass while dark imagery plays. Gabriel morphs into a skeleton while at the same time trying to excavate himself. Ultimately, the viewers are left with a gleam of hope as mushrooms sprout to form the word "HELP," followed by "HEAL" in blooming flowers after Gabriel has emerged from underground, now clad in white.

The Secret World Live version of the song features a chaotic blend of high-pitched distorted guitar (by guitarist David Rhodes) as well as occasional jarring synth bass stabs and an expansive performance on the drums. Gabriel wore a special "helmet" with a video camera attached in an antenna-like way, showing in great detail his facial expressions, while moving in time with the music. This is used to create a particularly grotesque image of Gabriel, most prominent during the "freak-out" sequence in which the camera is pointed down Gabriel's throat.

Awards and nominations

|-
| rowspan="3" | 1992
| rowspan="3" | Grammy Award
| Best Male Rock Vocal Performance
| 
|-
| Best Rock Song
| 
|-
| Best Music Video
| 
|-
| rowspan="6" | 1993
| rowspan="3" | MTV Video Music Awards
| Video of the Year
| 
|-
| Viewer's Choice Award
| 
|-
| International Viewer's Choice Award for MTV Europe
| 
|}

Track listings
All songs were written by Peter Gabriel.

CD maxi
 "Digging in the Dirt" – 5:16
 "Digging in the Dirt" (instrumental) – 5:10
 "Quiet Steam" – 6:25
 "Bashi-Bazouk" – 4:47

7-inch single
 "Digging in the Dirt" – 5:16
 "Quiet Steam" – 6:23

Personnel
 Peter Gabriel – lead vocals, programming, synth bass, keyboards
 Tony Levin – bass guitar
 David Rhodes – electric guitar
 Manu Katché – drums
 David Bottrill – additional programming

Additional musicians
 Richard Blair – additional programming
 Leo Nocentelli – additional guitar
 Hossam Ramzy – surdo
 Babacar Faye – djembe
 Assane Thiam – tama
 Ayub Ogada – backing vocals
 Peter Hammill – backing vocals
 Richard Macphail – backing vocals

Charts

Weekly charts

Year-end charts

See also
 List of number-one mainstream rock hits (United States)
 Number one modern rock hits of 1992

References

1992 singles
1992 songs
Animated music videos
Geffen Records singles
Grammy Award for Best Short Form Music Video
Peter Gabriel songs
Song recordings produced by Daniel Lanois
Songs written by Peter Gabriel
Stop-motion animated music videos